Job Mayo (born 19 October 1941) is a Filipino wrestler. He competed in two events at the 1964 Summer Olympics.

References

External links
 

1941 births
Living people
Filipino male sport wrestlers
Olympic wrestlers of the Philippines
Wrestlers at the 1964 Summer Olympics
Place of birth missing (living people)